The Jaravăț or Jăravăț is a left tributary of the river Bârlad in Romania. It discharges into the Bârlad in Grivița.

References

Rivers of Romania
Rivers of Galați County
Rivers of Vaslui County